Beshbalik is an ancient Turkic archaeological site, now located in Jimsar County, Changji Hui Autonomous Prefecture, Xinjiang, China. The ancient city was initially called Beiting or Ting Prefecture, and was the headquarters of the Beiting Protectorate during the 8th century. It was later known as Beshbalik and became one of the capitals of the Uyghur Khaganate and then the Kingdom of Qocho.

History 
The name Beshbalik first appears in history in the description of the events of 713 in the Turkic Kul Tigin inscription. It was one of the largest of five towns in the Uyghur Khaganate.  The Tibetans briefly held the city in 790.

After the attack, a significant part of the Uyghur Khaganate population fled to the area of the present Jimsar County and Tarim Basin in general in 840, where they founded the Kingdom of Qocho. The Uyghurs submitted to Genghis Khan in 1207. Beshbalik consisted of five parts: an outer town, the northern gate of the outer town, the extended town of the west, the inner town and a small settlement within the inner town. At first, the city was the political center of the Uyghur Idiquit (monarch) and his Mongol queen, Altalun, daughter of Genghis Khan under the Mongol Empire in the first half of the 13th century. Alans were recruited into the Mongol forces with one unit called "Right Alan Guard" which was combined with "recently surrendered" soldiers, Mongols, and Chinese soldiers stationed in the area of the former Kingdom of Qocho and in Besh Balikh the Mongols established a Chinese military colony led by Chinese general Qi Kongzhi (Ch'i Kung-chih). Due to military struggles between the Chagatai Khanate and the Yuan dynasty during the reign of Kublai Khan, the city was abandoned and lost its prosperity in the late 13th century. The History of Yuan records the name as both Wu-ch'eng 五城 (5 cities) and Bie-shi-ba-li 别失八里.

Notes

References 
 Beckwith, Christopher I. (2009). Empires of the Silk Road: A History of Central Eurasia from the Bronze Age to the Present. Princeton University Press. .

Central Asia